The R42 was a New York City Subway car model built by the St. Louis Car Company between 1969 and 1970 for the IND/BMT B Division. There were 400 cars in the R42 fleet, numbered 4550–4949. It was the last  B Division car built for the New York City Subway until the R143 in 2001, and the last car model class to be built in married pairs.

The first R42 cars entered service on May 9, 1969. Various modifications were made over the years to the R42 fleet. In the late 1980s, the R42 cars were rebuilt by Morrison–Knudsen and the Coney Island Rapid Transit Car Overhaul Shop. The R160 order replaced most of the R42s in the late 2000s, though 50 cars of the original fleet remained. The R179 order replaced the remainder of the R42s in the late 2010s, and the final train of R42s ran in passenger service on February 12, 2020. After retirement, most of the cars were sunk as artificial reefs, scrapped, or placed into storage, but a handful have been preserved and others retained for various purposes.

Description
The R42s were numbered 4550–4949. They were the first fleet of New York City Subway cars to be fully equipped with Stone-Safety 10 ton air conditioning systems/units. Such units were similarly found on the last ten R38s (4140–4149) and all two-hundred R40As (4350–4549).

The R42s were also the first cars to use solid-state converters in place of the motor-generators as standard equipment and were also the last cars to be equipped with the tried-and-true, and extremely reliable WABCO RT-2 or SMEE braking system temporarily, until returning in 1983 with the R62s for the IRT division, after disastrous results with the newer WABCO RT-5 or P-Wire braking systems used on their R44 and R46 cars of the 1970s. They were also the last cars to not have the two-note warning chime that was present on the R44 and all of the train models following it.

History
By January 5, 1970, all cars were in service.

Post-delivery, overhaul, and mishaps
Initially, the R42s suffered from air conditioning and brake malfunctions, frequently injuring crew members.

In 1973, cars 4764–4765 were sent to Garrett AiResearch's facilities in Los Angeles, California, to test out an experimental flywheel energy storage and energy-saving system and equipment. Car 4764 received this energy storage, conservation equipment, and machinery with batteries and amber-type digital readouts indicating the amount of energy used by the equipment, while 4765 remained untouched. These cars were later tested at the UMTA and the USDOT testing facility in Pueblo, Colorado for evaluation, before being returned to the MTA in 1976 for in-service testing on all BMT/IND lines to check the effectiveness of the technology.

In 1977, pantograph gates, salvaged from retired R1 through R9 cars, were modified and installed on the front ends of the R42s. Baloney coiled spring type inter car safety barriers were also installed on the blind ends of the married pairs.

Between 1988 and 1989, the R42s underwent overhaul as a result of deferred maintenance in the New York City Subway during the 1970s and the 1980s. 282 cars (most cars from 4550 to 4839) were overhauled by Morrison–Knudsen, while the last 110 cars (4840–4949) were rebuilt in-house by the Coney Island Rapid Transit Car Overhaul Shop in Brooklyn. Notable changes from the overhaul included the replacement of the original doors by stainless steel doors with smaller windows. Morrison–Knudsen also removed the blue door indicator lights at the ends of the cars, but kept the original Westinghouse XM829 master controllers in their cabs. The Coney Island rebuilds retained their blue indicator lights. The eight cars that were not rebuilt were 4680–4681, 4685, 4714–4715, 4726, and 4766–4767, which were prematurely scrapped due to damage sustained in various accidents during the 1970s and 1980s. As cars 4684 and 4727 lost their mates in separate incidents, the two cars were paired with each other and subsequently overhauled.

On June 6, 1995, cars 4664–4665 were involved in a collision on the Williamsburg Bridge with straight-ended R40A cars 4460–4461. Car 4664 was scrapped in 2000 (along with cars 4685 and 4726, which were not involved in the accident) and R40A 4461 was taken out of service, leaving 4665 to be mated with R40A 4460. This pair today survives as part of the museum fleet.

On November 6, 2007, an  train of R42s was involved in an accident when the motorman attempted to relay it south of the Chambers Street station. As the R42 fleet was being retired at the time, the entire consist was hauled to the 207th Street Yard for reefing instead of being repaired, even though only the first two cars suffered major damage.

Retirement

The R160 order replaced the vast majority of the R42s. All of the Coney Island-rebuilt cars were retired first from July 2007 to May 2008 due to various structural and braking issues that plagued them throughout their rebuilt lifespan. Subsequently, with the exception of the eight cars involved in the November 6, 2007 accident, most Morrison–Knudsen-rebuilt cars followed from December 2008 until December 2009, when it was decided to retire the NYCT R44s instead. 50 cars (4788–4817 and 4820–4839) remained and were assigned to East New York Yard, operating on the J and Z. These 50 cars periodically underwent SMS (Scheduled Maintenance Service, a life extension program) cycles.

The R179 order replaced the remainder of the R42s. Since the delivery of the four-car R179 sets, demand for the R42s drastically lowered. By late April 2019, they were no longer formally assigned for revenue service, becoming a contingency fleet. With the R179 delivery completed, the R42s were gradually phased out until the last train made its final trip on the J on December 30, 2019.  However, between January 8 and January 24, 2020, the R42s were restored to revenue service due to the R179 being pulled from service. Finally, on February 12, 2020, the R42s were officially retired when the last train made its final trip on the A as part of a ceremonial farewell excursion sponsored by the New York Transit Museum.

Following retirement, nearly all cars retired by the R160s were stripped of parts and sunk as artificial reefs. After the reefing program ended in April 2010, leftover retired R42s were trucked to Sims Metal Management's Newark facility to be scrapped and processed in mid-2013. Meanwhile, the 50 remaining cars retired by the R179s were gradually reassigned to work service starting in summer 2020; they handle such tasks as providing traction for B Division rail adhesion trains and refuse trains.

Other R42 cars were saved for various purposes throughout the New York City Subway system. The full list includes:
 4572–4573 – preserved by the New York Transit Museum. This pair was used in the famous chase scene in the film The French Connection. The cars have been used on several recent NYTM fan trips, specifically as a part of the Train of Many Metals (TOMM).
 4665 (and its R40A mate 4460) – preserved by the Railway Preservation Corp.
 4736–4737 – donated to East New York's Transit Tech High School on April 14, 2009, replacing R30 car 8337, which was reefed a few months later.

In popular culture
An R42 is featured in film The French Connection. The cars have been used as a chase scene and crashes into an R32.

References

Further reading
 Sansone, Gene. Evolution of New York City subways: An illustrated history of New York City's transit cars, 1867–1997. New York Transit Museum Press, New York, 1997

External links

 nycsubway.org – NYC Subway Cars: R42
 
 

Train-related introductions in 1969
New York City Subway rolling stock
St. Louis multiple units